Jincheng Township is an urban township on the southwestern corner of the island of Kinmen (Quemoy). It is the county seat of Kinmen County, Fujian Province, Republic of China (Taiwan). Jincheng was the seat of the ROC's Fukien Province from 1949–1956 and 1996–2019. In March 2012, it was named one of the Top 10 Small Tourist Towns by the Tourism Bureau.

History
Jincheng also served as the capital of Republic of China's Fujian Province from 1949 to 1956. From 1956 to 1996, the capital of Fujian Province was relocated to Xindian, Taipei County, Taiwan Province. In 1996, the capital was moved back to Jincheng.

Administrative divisions
Jincheng is divided into eight urban villages:
 Beimen Village
 Gucheng Village
 Jinshui/Jinshuei Village
 Nanmen Village
 Dongmen/Tungmen Village
 Xianan/Sianan Village
 Ximen Village
 Zhusha/Jhusha Village
 Zhushan Village (Chushan)

Mayors
Appointed mayors
 Wang Ping-Yuan (1954-1955)
 Liao Ko-Hsiung (1954-1958)
 Chiu Yuan (1958- 1960)
Elected mayors
 Shih Ping-Yen (1960-1971)
 Hsu Chi-Yung (1971-1980)
 Fu Wen-Min (1980 -1982)
 Cheng Ching-Li (1982-1990)
 Hsu Wen-Li (1990 -1991)
 Chen Shih-Chi (1991-1992)
 Hsu Yung-Chen (1992-1994)
 Hsu Chin-Hsiang (1994-2002)
 Tsai Hui-Shih (2002-2010)
 Shih Chao-Min (2010-2018)
 Li Cheng-Chih (2018–present)

Climate

Government institutions

 Kinmen-Matsu Joint Services Center
 Kinmen County Government
 Kinmen County Council
 Kinmen Fisheries Research Institute

Infrastructure
 Tashan Power Plant

Tourist attractions

 Chastity Arch for Qiu Liang-gong's Mother
 Chen Shi-yin Western Style House
 Deyue Gun Tower
 Gugang Lake
 Houpu 16 Creative Park
 Jiangong Islet
 Jincheng Civil Defense Tunnel
 Jincheng Seaside Park
 Jinshui Elementary School
 Juguang Tower
 Kinmen Military Headquarters of the Qing Dynasty
 Maoshan Pagoda
 Mofan Street
 Wentai Pagoda
 Xujiang Xiaowo Stone Inscription
 Yannan Academy
 Zhaishan Tunnel

Transportation
 Shuitou Pier

Notable natives
 Dong Zhisen, journalist

References